"I Couldn't Cry If I Wanted To" is a 1962 Motown song written by Edward Holland, Jr. and Norman Whitfield. It would later be released as B-sides for singles by The Temptations (in 1966) and Holland himself (in 1963), both of which were produced by Whitfield.

In the Temptations case, their recording had spent four years in the vault before being remixed in June 1966 and released that November, making it the last recording from the period of the original lineup to be put on a single (as a B-Side). It is also one of the few B-Sides that was led by Paul Williams since David Ruffin, whose vocals are not on this track due to being recorded before he joined, took his spot as the group's main lead singer.

Cash Box said that the Temptations version has a "powerful soul sound."

Personnel

Temptations version 
 Lead vocals by Paul Williams
 Background vocals by Eddie Kendricks, Melvin Franklin, Al Bryant and Otis Williams
 Produced by Norman Whitfield
 Instrumentation by The Funk Brothers.

Eddie Holland version 
 Lead vocals by Eddie Holland
 Background vocals by The Andantes (Jackie Hicks, Marlene Barrow, and Louvain Demps) and The Love-Tones
 Produced by Norman Whitfield
 Instrumentation by The Funk Brothers.

References

External links
HDH discography

1962 songs
1963 singles
1966 singles
Eddie Holland songs
The Temptations songs
Songs written by Norman Whitfield
Songs written by Eddie Holland
Motown singles